Hilkka Riihivuori (née Kuntola, born 24 December 1952 in Jurva, Southern Ostrobothnia) is a Finnish  former cross-country skier who competed during the 1970s and 1980s. She competed in three Winter Olympics, earning a total of four medals (1972 and 1976 under her maiden name and 1980 under her married name.). Riihivuori also competed several times at the Holmenkollen ski festival, winning twice at 10 km (1974, 1980) and once at 5 km (1977).

Riihivuori's biggest success was at the FIS Nordic World Ski Championships, where she won two medals in the 10 km (silver: 1982, bronze: 1978), a gold medal in the 4 × 5 km relay (1978), and two silver medals in the 5 km (1978, 1982).

For her successes in Nordic skiing World Championships and at the Holmenkollen, Kuntola received the Holmenkollen medal in 1977 (Shared with Helena Takalo and Walter Steiner.).

Cross-country skiing results
All results are sourced from the International Ski Federation (FIS).

Olympic Games
 4 medals – (4 silver)

World Championships
 6 medals – (1 gold, 3 silver, 2 bronze)

World Cup

Season standings

Individual podiums

 3 podiums 

Note:  Until the 1999 World Championships, World Championship races were included in the World Cup scoring system.

References

  - click Holmenkollmedaljen for downloadable pdf file 
  - click Vinnere for downloadable pdf file

External links
 . Maiden name
 . Married name

1952 births
Living people
People from Kurikka
Cross-country skiers at the 1972 Winter Olympics
Cross-country skiers at the 1976 Winter Olympics
Cross-country skiers at the 1980 Winter Olympics
Finnish female cross-country skiers
Holmenkollen medalists
Holmenkollen Ski Festival winners
Olympic cross-country skiers of Finland
Olympic medalists in cross-country skiing
FIS Nordic World Ski Championships medalists in cross-country skiing
Medalists at the 1976 Winter Olympics
Medalists at the 1980 Winter Olympics
Medalists at the 1972 Winter Olympics
Olympic silver medalists for Finland
Sportspeople from South Ostrobothnia